Marshmallow Love Seat #5670, commonly known as the Marshmallow sofa, is a modernist sofa produced by the American furniture company Herman Miller, that was originally manufactured between 1956 and 1961. It is considered the most iconic of all modernist sofas. The sofa was designed by Irving Harper of George Nelson Associates. It was produced in two lengths from 1956 to 1961. It consists of a metal frame with round discs of covered foam, or "marshmallows", spread across the seat and back in a lattice arrangement.

The sofa, in the smaller of the two sizes, was re-issued in the 1980s as part of the "Herman Miller Classics" line, and continues in production today.

History
The design was created in 1954 when a salesman for a Long Island plastics company presented to George Nelson's New York City studio an example of the company's ability to create round, 12-inch foam discs that became "self-skinned". The limited manufacturing costs made the item inviting, and designer Irving Harper was asked to design a piece of furniture around the discs. Over a weekend Harper designed a sofa, incorporating 18 of the discs arranged over a metal frame. The invention did not live up to its promise, as covering the individual seat pads proved costly and time-consuming, turning the intended budget piece into a luxury product. Nevertheless, Herman Miller went ahead with the sofa's production, and introduced it in 1956.

The Marshmallow sofa was originally issued by Herman Miller in 1956, and appeared in their 1957 catalog. The sofa was dropped in 1961. Despite its popularity, and visibility in Herman Miller publications, only 186 Marshmallow sofas were produced between 1956 and 1961. The 52" version was re-issued in the 1980s as part of the "Herman Miller Classics" line, and continues in production today, though in limited numbers.

Design
Officially listed by Herman Miller as the Marshmallow love seat #5670, the sofa was designed for both residential and contract (office) sales. The playful design of the Marshmallow sofa is the result of placement of circular "marshmallow" cushions at regular intervals across a metal frame. The cushions were covered in either fabric, vinyl, or leather in bright colors. Generally all the cushions were the same color, but the sofa could also be ordered with cushions of various colors for a more whimsical look.

The Marshmallow sofa was designed in the "atomistic" style seen in other classic George Nelson Associates designs, such as the "Ball clock" (1950) and the  "Hang-It-All" (1953). The "atomistic" style explodes its parts into separate, brightly colored elements, in this case the seat cushions. It was an adaptation of artist's representations of the atom, which used individual, brightly colored dots to portray atomic particles.

The marshmallow sofa was produced in two lengths. The 52" version incorporates 18 cushions in a pattern of 4-5-5-4. The 103" length uses 38 cushions in a 9-10-10-9 pattern.

Design attribution
The Marshmallow sofa was designed in 1954 by Irving Harper. For decades the design of the Marshmallow sofa was attributed to George Nelson, as was the practice for designs coming out of George Nelson Associates, Inc. However, it was later revealed that many of the firm's designs were actually those of other designers working for the firm. John Pile, a designer who worked for George Nelson Associates, Inc. in the 1950s explained, "George's attitude was that it was okay for individual designers to be given credit in trade publications, but for the consumer world, the credit should always be to the firm, not the individual. He didn't always follow through on that policy though."

As collector's items
Examples of the 186 originally produced sofas routinely sell for $15,000 or more. The extremely rare 103" length is rarely offered for sale. One example, covered in white fabric and signed by Irving Harper, was sold by Sotheby's in 2000 for $37,500.

In popular culture
On the cover of the second volume of Spy × Family, Anya Forger is shown sitting on a Marshmallow sofa.

References

Couches
History of furniture
Modernism
Individual models of furniture